Flateby is a village in Enebakk municipality, Norway. Its population is 3,298.

References

Villages in Akershus
Enebakk